Nimbi may refer to:
A game invented by Piet Hein (Denmark)
A rare plural of nimbus or halo in religious iconography